William Godwin was a British political philosopher, novelist, and journalist.

William Godwin is also the name of:

William Godwin the Younger (1803–1832), English writer
William Godwin (MP) (died 1557), English politician
William Godwin (sport shooter) (1912–2000), British Olympic shooter
Billy Godwin (born 1964), American baseball coach

See also
William Godwin (biography), 1984 biography of the philosopher by Peter Marshall
Edward William Godwin (1833–1886), English architect-designer
William Goodwin (disambiguation)